George Morrison (born 2005) is a professional footballer who plays for Fleetwood Town, as a midfielder. Born in England, he represents the Scotland U18 national team at International level.

Club career
Morrison attended Ripley St Thomas Church of England Academy in Lancaster, Lancashire and also played youth football for Lancaster City up to under-11 level. Whilst at Lancaster City, he was scouted by Fleetwood Town and joined the Academy at the age of ten. He progressed through the age groups and went on to make his debut for the under-18 side aged only 15, contributing to the side winning the EFL North West Youth Alliance in 2021. He played a huge role for the under-18's during the 2021–22 season whilst still an under-16 player and even featured twelve times for the under-21 side.

On 24 October 2022, he signed his first professional contract with the club, putting pen to paper on a two-year deal only months after starting his two-year youth scholarship. He made his first team and professional debut on 5 November 2022 when he replaced Brendan Sarpong-Wiredu as a late substitute in the 3–1 FA Cup First round victory over Oxford City at Highbury Stadium.

International career
On 6 September 2022, he was called up by Scotland under-18's for a three match friendly tournament at the end of the month in Limoges for the fixtures against Poland, France and Estonia. He was named as a substitute for the game against Poland, but made his debut when he was subbed on during the match. He started the next game against the home nation, France, going on to score on his first full cap in the 32nd minute.

Career statistics

References

2005 births
Living people
English people of Scottish descent
Scottish footballers
English footballers
Association football defenders
Scotland youth international footballers
Fleetwood Town F.C. players